Ian Ferguson (born 5 August 1968 in Dunfermline) is a Scottish former professional footballer. He played for ten clubs in a seventeen-year senior career.

Career
Ferguson began his career at junior club Lochgelly Albert in the 1980s. In 1987, he signed professional terms with Raith Rovers, and went on to make 111 league appearances for the Stark's Park club, scoring 23 goals.

In 1992, he moved to Edinburgh to join Hearts in a £100,000 deal. In just under two years with the Jambos, he scored nine goals in 60 appearances, the most notable being the winner in an Edinburgh Derby in March 1992. Ferguson signed for St Johnstone for £110,000 in 1993, but his four years in Perth were blighted by injury and he managed only 42 league appearances.

Ayr United came in for Ferguson's services in 1997, and with his injuries behind him, managed to score sixteen goals in 55 games with the Honest Men, including a crucial strike in a Scottish Cup tie against local rivals Kilmarnock.

Ferguson left Ayr in 1999 after only two years, and went on to play for six other clubs in as many years, bringing his professional career to a close in 2004 with Berwick Rangers. After leaving Shielfield Park, He returned to his junior football roots with Bo'ness United. He later played with Rosebank AFC in Dunfermline.

External links
 
 

1968 births
Living people
Footballers from Dunfermline
Lochgelly Albert F.C. players
Scottish footballers
Raith Rovers F.C. players
Heart of Midlothian F.C. players
St Johnstone F.C. players
Ayr United F.C. players
Livingston F.C. players
Greenock Morton F.C. players
Hamilton Academical F.C. players
Forfar Athletic F.C. players
Stenhousemuir F.C. players
Berwick Rangers F.C. players
Bo'ness United F.C. players
Scottish Football League players
Association football forwards
Scottish Junior Football Association players